Never Forget (Where You Come From) is the debut studio album by German pop group Bro'Sis. It was released on 21 January 2002 on Cheyenne Records, Polydor and Zeitgeist. It was primarily produced by Toni Cottura, with additional production from Alex Christensen, Marc Mozart, Syndicate Music, and others. The album reached the top of the German, Austrian and Swiss albums chart and spawned five singles, including number-one single "I Believe" and a cover version of 98 Degrees' 1999 Christmas single "The Gift".

Including its Special Winter Edition (released on 11 November 2002) and the album managed to sell more than 500,000 copies domestically. With 38 weeks in the German Top 100, a platinum, and a gold certification the album became the eleventh-most-successful album of 2002.

Track listing

Credits and personnel 
 Jörn Heilblut - acoustic guitar
 W. Kerscheck - conductor
 J. Klein - keyboards
 P. Könemann - keyboards
 Jürgen Leydel - guitars
 Mirko Schaffer - bass

Music & Lyrics

Music 
 Luca Barro
 Thorsten Brötzmann
 Stephan Browarczyk
 Christoph Brüx
 Toni Cottura
 Christoph Leis-Bendorff
 Frank Lio

Lyrics 
 Patricia Bernetti
 Thorsten Brötzmann
 David Brunner
 Toni Cottura
 Alex Christensen
 Alex Geringas

Production 
 Producer: David Brunner, Island Brothers, Alex Christensen, Toni Cottura, D.Fact, John Eaton, Gerret Frerichs, Achim Jannsen, Giorgio Koppehele, Martin Koppehele, Frank Lio, Marc Mozart, N-Dee, Christoph Papendieck, Pascal F.E.O.S., Mirko von Schlieffen, Roland Spremberg
 Vocal recording: Florian Grummes
 Vocal arrangement: Terri Bjerre
 Engineers: Florian Grummers
 Assistant engineers: Joachim Feske,
 Mixing: Boogieman, Broschi, David Brunner, Koma, Christoph Leis-Bendorff, Quickmix, Andi Regler, Rollo, Jürgen Wind
 Mastering: J. Quincy Kramer, MM Sound
 Artwork: Ronald Reinsberg
 Photography: Benjamin Wolf

Charts

Weekly charts

Year-end charts

References

External links 
 

2002 debut albums
Bro'Sis albums
Polydor Records albums